The men's 50 metre rifle three positions team competition at the 2006 Asian Games in Doha, Qatar was held on 7 December at the Lusail Shooting Range.

The men's 50 metre rifle three positions consists of the prone, standing and kneeling positions, fired in that order, with 3×40 shots for men.

The men's match has separate commands and times for each position, giving each shooter 45 minutes to complete the prone part, 75 minutes for the standing part, and 60 minutes for the kneeling part, including sighting shots for each part.

The top eight competitors reach the final, where the score zones are divided into tenths, giving up to 10.9 points for each shot. The men's final consists of ten shots from the standing position, with a time limit of 75 seconds per shot. The competition is won by the shooter who reaches the highest aggregate score (qualification + final, maximum 1309.0).

China defended the Asian Games team title of this men's 50m rifle three positions event with an Asian record at the Lusail Shooting Complex. The Chinese trio of Zhang Lei, Zhang Fu and Liu Tianyou, collected a combined total of 3494 points, surpassing the previous Asian mark of 3477 points set by their compatriots in the Asian Shooting Championships in Kuala Lumpur, Malaysia in 2004.

It was China's third consecutive time to win the Asian Games team title of this event. Kazakhstan team of Vitaliy Dovgun, Yuriy Melsitov and Yuriy Yurkov finished second with a total of 3457 points, one point ahead of the third-placed Indian team of Imran Hassan Khan, Gagan Narang and Sanjeev Rajput.

Schedule
All times are Arabia Standard Time (UTC+03:00)

Records

Results

References 

ISSF Results Overview
Final Results

External links
Official website

Men Rifle 50 3P T